Hocking & Co
may refer to :

 Hocking and Company, the publishing company
  Hocking & Co, publisher of the Kalgoorlie Miner newspaper
  Hocking & Co, publisher of the Western Argus newspaper
 Sidney Edwin Hocking, founder of Hocking and Company